Lilydale, originally known as Upper Piper, is a small town in northern Tasmania, Australia. It is located near Mount Arthur. At the 2016 census, Lilydale had a population of 277. The town's notable attractions include the Lilydale Falls, two small waterfalls, Mount Arthur, and, along the main street, a series of telegraph poles painted with murals.

History

The town is believed to have been renamed in 1887, possibly due to the predominance of Christmas lilies in the area.

The Upper Pipers River Post Office opened on 1 December 1873 and was renamed Lilydale in 1887.

Facilities 
Lilydale, Karoola and Turners Marsh are all situated on the North-eastern Railway branch line from Launceston that opened to Scottsdale on 9 September 1889.

As of 2017, Lilydale had an Australian rules football team and a bowls team. It also has a swimming pool open at select times of the year.

More recently, the town has attracted attention due to the Lilydale Village Market, created as a result of mediation between parties in a 2008 environmental dispute.

Nearby localities

Karoola

Karoola is a small area located off Pipers River Road, about 6 km outside Lilydale town. Karoola means "fresh water" in the local Aboriginal dialect. Facilities in the locality include a telephone box, an emergency fire shed, a Catholic church, a tennis court and a community hall. The local fire station is situated 5 km along Pipers River Road in Turners Marsh. There was once a general store but it was sold to a private buyer.

Underwood

Underwood is a locality just outside Lilydale. The Pipers River flows through the area.

Hollybank Forest
Hollybank Forest is a 140-hectare reserve located on the Pipers River, near Underwood, 5 km outside Lilydale. It was originally used to source timber for sawmills in Launceston. Because the land was unable to be farmed the area was taken over by Forestry Tasmania who have managed it since. There are a few short walks and a picnic area.

Lower Turners Marsh

Lower Turners Marsh is a locality between Lilydale town and Launceston. Lower Turners Marsh is located on Pipers River Road; the area is mostly farms and rural residences. Lower Turners Marsh is sometimes called Karoola.

Turners Marsh

Turners Marsh is a locality on Pipers River Road, southwest of Lilydale and south of Lower Turners Marsh. Much of the area is bushland, with some small farms. Turners Marsh has a karting track.

References

External links 

Towns in Tasmania
Launceston, Tasmania
Localities of City of Launceston